Echendu Adiele (17 November 1978 – 18 June 2011) was a Nigerian professional footballer who played as a central defender.

Career
Adiele played club football in Nigeria for Sharks, and in Germany for Fortuna Düsseldorf, Borussia Neunkirchen, 1. FC Saarbrücken, SV Darmstadt 98 and SV Waldhof Mannheim.

Death
Adiele died in his sleep on 18 June 2011. It seems that he was poisoned.

References

External links
 

1978 births
2011 deaths
Nigerian footballers
Sharks F.C. players
Fortuna Düsseldorf players
1. FC Saarbrücken players
SV Darmstadt 98 players
SV Waldhof Mannheim players
2. Bundesliga players
Sportspeople from Port Harcourt
Borussia Neunkirchen players
Association football central defenders
Deaths by poisoning
Nigerian expatriate footballers
Expatriate footballers in Germany
Nigerian expatriate sportspeople in Germany